Mousampur is a small village in Alwar district of Rajasthan, a state in northern India. It has about 500 population. Mousampur has one upper primary school, aganbadi center, and a few temples. The main occupation is farming. The village has only Hindus. It is "Yadav" (Ahir) majority village. There are others castes as well including Panjabi, Baniya, Carpenters (Khati), Barbers (Sain), SCs (Verma), Jogis, Mathurs etc.
Mosumpur was  under General Fateh Naseeb Khan who was a General in Alwar armed forces Under  Maharaja Jai Singh Prabhakar Bahadur. Raja Jai Singh gave this village to his trusted Gernal Fateh.

Villages in Alwar district